The 1925–26 Magyar Kupa (English: Hungarian Cup) was the 9th season of Hungary's annual knock-out cup football competition.

Final

Replay

See also
 1925–26 Nemzeti Bajnokság I

References

External links
 Official site 
 soccerway.com

1925–26 in Hungarian football
1925–26 domestic association football cups
1925-26